Tod McBride (born January 26, 1976 in Los Angeles, California) is a former American football cornerback in the National Football League. He was signed by the Green Bay Packers as an undrafted free agent in 1999. He played college football at UCLA.

McBride also played for the Atlanta Falcons, Seattle Seahawks, and St. Louis Rams.

1976 births
Living people
American football cornerbacks
UCLA Bruins football players
Green Bay Packers players
Atlanta Falcons players
Seattle Seahawks players
St. Louis Rams players